"In Love wit Chu" is the lead single from Da Brat's fourth studio album, Limelite, Luv & Niteclubz. The song featured R&B group Cherish, in what was the group's first official appearance. The single peaked at n°9 on the Billboard rhythmic.

Background
Released on June 8, 2003, "In Love wit Chu" was the first and only single from Limelite, Luv & Niteclubz and was produced and co-written by L. T. Hutton, becoming Da Brat's first single to not be produced or written by Jermaine Dupri. The song eventually peaked at No. 44 on the Billboard Hot 100 during the summer of 2003, narrowly missing becoming her seventh top 40 single. It also peaked at n°9 on the Billboard rhythmic. The song featured the debuting Cherish, who made their first appearance on this song, later in the year Da Brat returned the favor by appearing on Cherish's "Miss P.", which was their solo debut.

Music video
The music video features cameo appearances by Mariah Carey, boxer Roy Jones Jr., and Jermaine Dupri.

Single track listing
"In Love wit Chu" (Radio Edit)- 4:13
"World Premiere" (Radio Mix)- 3:18
"In Love wit Chu"- 4:08

Charts

References

2003 singles
Cherish (group) songs
Da Brat songs
Songs written by Da Brat
Music videos directed by Bryan Barber
2002 songs
Songs written by L.T. Hutton
Song recordings produced by L.T. Hutton
So So Def Recordings singles